Percy Anthony Pierre (born January 3, 1939) is an American electrical engineer. He was the first African-American Ph.D. in electrical engineering, appointed assistant secretary of the U.S. Army for Research and Development, and appointed acting Secretary of the Army. Pierre was the principal architect of the national minority engineering effort. He currently is vice president emeritus and professor of electrical and computer engineering at Michigan State University.

Background 
Pierre was born on January 3, 1939, to Rosa Villavaso and Percy John Pierre in Welcome, St. James Parish, Louisiana. In 1957, Pierre graduated from St. Augustine High School in New Orleans. He credits the priests at St. Augustine with instilling in him two overriding missions: to excel intellectually in engineering and use his career to make a difference in the lives of other African-Americans.

Education
Pierre earned his Ph.D. in electrical engineering at Johns Hopkins University in 1967. He was a postdoctoral fellow at the University of Michigan from 1967-68. Pierre attended the University of Notre Dame on scholarship, earning his bachelor's and master's degrees in 1961 and 1963, respectively, and has been honored at Notre Dame for his distinguished public service.

Career
Pierre's career spans more than four decades and includes tenure as:
 Dean of the College of Engineering, Architecture and Computer Sciences (CEACS) at Howard University in Washington, D.C., 1971–77
 Program officer for the Alfred P. Sloan Foundation, 1973–75
 Assistant secretary of the U. S. Army for Research, Development and Acquisition, 1977–81 (the first African-American to hold that position or similar positions in the armed services)
 Acting secretary of the U. S. Army, January 1981
 President of Prairie View A&M University, 1983–89
 Vice president of research and graduate studies at Michigan State University, 1990–95
 Professor of electrical and computer engineering at Michigan State University, 1990–present

U.S. Army
As assistant secretary of the U.S. Army, Pierre managed a $12 billion annual budget for research and development that included the completion of the development and initial production of the Abrams tank in 1979 and the Patriot missile system and Apache helicopter in 1980.

National minority engineering effort
In 1973, Pierre co-chaired the National Academy of Engineering (NAE) Symposium, which officially launched the national minority engineering effort. He worked with NAE to implement the recommendations of the symposium. In a parallel effort, Pierre served as the program officer for minority engineering at the Alfred P. Sloan Foundation. He helped establish numerous minority engineering organizations to increase the financial support and mentoring opportunities available for minority engineering students. These include the National Action Council for Minorities in Engineering (NACME); National Consortium for Graduate Degrees for Minorities in Engineering and Science (GEM); Math, Engineering and Science Achievement (MESA); and Southeastern Consortium of Minorities in Engineering (SECME).

National Academy of Engineering
In 2009, Pierre was elected a member of the National Academy of Engineering for service as assistant secretary of the Army, contributions to engineering education, and leadership in creating the national minority engineering effort. This is one of the highest professional honors accorded an engineer.

Personal life 
Pierre is married to Olga A. Markham. They have two grown daughters, Kristin and Allison Pierre.

References

External links
 First African-American Ph.D.
 NACME 30th Anniversary Gala 2004
 Percy Pierre biography from MSU College of Engineering
 Percy A. Pierre, President of Prairie View A&M University
 Distinguished Public Service Award from University of Notre Dame
 Leadership at College of Engineering, Architecture and Computer Sciences (CEACS), Howard University
 U.S. Army Research, Development and Acquisitions

1939 births
Living people
People from St. James Parish, Louisiana
University of Notre Dame alumni
Johns Hopkins University alumni
Howard University faculty
Michigan State University faculty
Prairie View A&M University people
Members of the United States National Academy of Engineering
American electrical engineers
University of Michigan fellows
United States Department of Defense officials